French-American School, or a variation in English or French, may refer to one of several schools in the United States that provide a French and American education:

 L'École Française du Maine, Freeport, Maine
 The French American International School (Portland, Oregon) in Portland, Oregon
 The French American International School (San Francisco) in San Francisco, California
 The French-American School of New York, New York
 French-American School of Rhode Island
 The French Immersion School of Washington, Bellevue, Washington
 The Lycée International de Los Angeles, California
 The French American School of Tampa Bay in St Petersburg, Florida